The  2012 AFF U-19 Youth Championship was held from 2 September to 8 September 2012, hosted by Vietnam. All games were played at the Thong Nhat Stadium in Ho Chi Minh City. Vietnam and Thailand were due to represent the AFF but Thailand withdrew and were replaced by Iran. Australia and Uzbekistan are the other competing nations.

The competition was held as preparation for the 2012 AFC U-19 Championship.

Standings & Results

Group stage

Third place play-off

Final

Winner

Goalscorers
4 goals
 Sardar Azmoun
 Alireza Jahanbakhsh

2 goals
 Jason Geria
 Riley Woodcock
 Igor Sergeev
 Abdul Aziz Yusupov

1 goal

 Terry Antonis
 Jake Barker-Daish
 Ryan Edwards
 Jesse Makarounas
 Adam Taggart
 Behnam Barzay
 Roozbeh Cheshmi
 Jakhongir Abdumuminov
 Makhstaliev Abbosbek
 Fomin Maksimillan
 Abdul Aziz Yusupov
 Phan Dinh Thang

Own goal
 Dao Duy Khanh (playing against Australia)
 Pham Hoang Lam (playing against Uzbekistan)

References

External links
 AFF official website

Under
2012 in Vietnamese football
2012
2012
2012 in youth association football